The 1989–90 BHL season was the eighth season of the British Hockey League, the top level of ice hockey in Great Britain. Nine teams participated in the league, and the Cardiff Devils won the league title by finishing first in the regular season. They also won the playoff championship.

Regular season

Playoffs

Group A

Group B

Semifinals
Cardiff Devils 5-1 Fife Flyers
Nottingham Panthers 4-5 Murrayfield Racers

Final
Cardiff Devils 6-5 (SO) Murrayfield Racers

References

External links
Season on hockeyarchives.info

1
United
British Hockey League seasons